Enterocolitis  is an inflammation of the digestive tract, involving enteritis of the small intestine and colitis of the colon. It may be caused by various infections, with bacteria, viruses, fungi, parasites, or other causes. Common clinical manifestations of enterocolitis are frequent diarrheal defecations, with or without nausea, vomiting, abdominal pain, fever, chills, alteration of general condition. General manifestations are given by the dissemination of the infectious agent or its toxins throughout the body, or – most frequently – by significant losses of water and minerals, the consequence of diarrhea and vomiting.

Signs and symptoms

Cause
Among the causal agents of acute enterocolitis are:
 bacteria: Salmonella, Shigella, Escherichia coli (E. coli), Campylobacter etc.
 viruses: enteroviruses, rotaviruses, Norovirus, adenoviruses
 fungi: candidiasis, especially in immunosuppressed patients or who have previously received prolonged antibiotic treatment
 parasites: Giardia lamblia (with high frequency of infestation in the population, but not always with clinical manifestations), Balantidium coli, Blastocystis homnis, Cryptosporidium (diarrhea in people with immunosuppression), Entamoeba histolytica (produces the amebian dysentery, common in tropical areas).

Diagnosis

Types
Specific types of enterocolitis include:
 necrotizing enterocolitis (most common in premature infants)
 pseudomembranous enterocolitis (also called "Pseudomembranous colitis")

Treatment
Treatment depends on aetiology e.g. Antibiotics such as metronidazole for bacteria infection, antiviral drug therapy for viral infection and
anti-helminths for parasitic infections

See also
 Gastroenteritis

References

External links 

Inflammations
Intestinal infectious diseases